Bootleg Detroit is the only authorized release of a live recording of Morphine. It was released on the label Rykodisc in September 2000. Recorded by Alan J. Schmit—a fan—on March 7, 1994, at St. Andrew’s Hall in Detroit, Michigan, it was edited and mixed under Mark Sandman’s supervision.  He also laid out and delivered the low-fi artwork for the album prior to the band’s final tour in Italy.

The enhanced CD contains concert footage of "Cure for Pain" and "The Saddest Song", recorded at the Montreux Jazz Festival in 1995.

Track listing
All tracks are written by Mark Sandman.

 "Intro"
 "Come Along"
 "Dana Intro"
 "Mary Won't You Call My Name?"
 "Banter 1"
 "Candy"
 "Sheila"
 "Billy Intro"
 "Claire"
 "My Brain"
 "Banter 2"
 "A Head with Wings"
 "Cure for Pain"
 "You Speak My Language"
 "Thursday"
 "Banter 3"
 "You Look Like Rain"
 "Buena"

Personnel
Morphine
Mark Sandman – vocals, 2-string slide bass
Dana Colley – baritone saxophone, tenor saxophone, double saxophone, vocals
Billy Conway – drums
Technical personnel
Phil Davidson – front of house sound engineer for Morphine
Toby Mountain – mastering
Brian Dunton – premastering

References

Morphine (band) albums
2000 live albums
Rykodisc live albums